Nayagaon is a village of Kherwara Chhaoni Tehsil in the Udaipur District of Rajasthan, India.

History 
Nayagaon was established around 130 years ago, by the Jain community from various areas like Dungarpur and some from Gujarat and other nearby places. There are many other communities which stays in Nayagaon and in its surroundings called Bhil Samaj and Vaisnav Samaj, which includes sub categories like Bhil, Panchal, Bunker, Meghval, Kumhar etc.

Geography 
Nayagaon is situated in the Udaipur district in south Rajasthan and very close to the border with Gujarat.

Education facility 
Nayagaon has one senior secondary school, one middle school for girls and one Jain samaj Trust owned School (both Hindi and English medium).

Villages in Udaipur district